Technetium oxide may refer to:
 Technetium(IV) oxide, TcO2
 Technetium trioxide, TcO3
 Technetium(VII) oxide, Tc2O7